Héctor Miguel Morales Llanas (born 3 May 1985) is a Mexican former professional footballer who played as a defender.

Career
His first soccer club was the Club de Futbol Monterrey Reserves and had the fortune of becoming a champion in his first tournament as a player of the first team of "The Gang". He started his career on the Mexican circuit with Mexican second division team Cobras de Ciudad Juárez during the tournaments Apertura 2004–2005 and Clausura 2004–2005. He then returned to Club de Futbol Monterrey to play with the first team. His debut in the Mexican 1st Divicion  was in a Monterrey against Atlante FC match on 26 August 2006. A year later, due to an injury, he was forced to leave the team and be part of Club de Futbol Real de Colima of the Mexican Second Division. After recovery and good performance, he was recalled by his team CF Monterrey in which a basis of commitment and good football, has been considered to be one of the most frequent players in Victor Manuel Vucetich team.

Honours
Monterrey
Mexican Primera División: Apertura 2009, Apertura 2010
CONCACAF Champions League: 2010–11, 2011–12, 2012–13

References

player profile at rayados.com

1985 births
Living people
C.F. Monterrey players
Atlante F.C. footballers
Lobos BUAP footballers
Footballers from Nuevo León
People from San Nicolás de los Garza
Association football defenders
Mexican footballers